José Acasuso and Flávio Saretta were the defending champions, but none competed this year.

Jiří Novák and Petr Pála won the title by defeating Michal Mertiňák and David Škoch 6–3, 6–3 in the final.

Seeds

Draw

Draw

References

External links
 Official results archive (ATP)
 Official results archive (ITF)

Croatia Open Umag